Ruxton Park is a park in Manitou Springs, El Paso County, Colorado at  in elevation. It passes by the site of the Halfway Hotel and then Ruxton Park at mile marker 3 on the 8.9 mile trip to Pikes Peak summit.

In the late 19th century and early 20th century, it was a small town established along Ruxton Creek near Iron Springs, Colorado (now Manitou Springs). Since 1925, it has been the site of a hydroelectric plant owned by the city of Colorado Springs and a weather station. Ruxton Park was only inhabited by a caretaker for the plant from 1930 to 2008, when the plant was fully automated.

History
In 1884, Thomas Palsgrove and his family lived in a cabin that was on a trail to the summit of Pike's Peak. They provided coffee and doughnuts as refreshments for hikers. He then began expansion of the cabin along Ruxton Creek that eventually was the Halfway Hotel with 22 rooms and was run by John Palsgrove by 1903.

Thomas and his brothers developed the site and in 1890 platted the streets for a town named Ruxton Park below the timber line where Ruxton and Sheep Creeks meet. Cabins were built on several sold lots.

The Manitou and Pike's Peak Railway was built in 1890, which brought tourists to the top of Pike's Peak beginning June 30, 1891. The first third of the trip is alongside Ruxton Creek. A stop was made at Ruxton Park where tourists could eat a meal at the "pleasant" Halfway Hotel.

Ruxton Park was described as an area of aspen trees, pine trees and flowers—surrounded by Pike's Peak, Mt. Rosa, Cameron's Cone and other peaks. Wealthy families from the western states had houses in the town where they sought the cooler mountain temperatures during the summers. The town had a "fancy tourist hotel", water tower, and post office.

In 1925, a water utility power plant was built for $16,866  and opened in Ruxton Park by the city of Colorado Springs. The stone hydroelectric plant generates electricity as Ruxton Creek flows into Manitou Springs from the mountain. A caretakers house was built in 1930 and from that time to 2008, nine Colorado Springs Utilities employees have lived there six months of the year, running the Ruxton Hydroelectric Plant and taking measurements for the National Weather Service. In 2008, the plant was fully automated. The city bought some of the town lots and maintained several houses, a garage, and storage buildings in Ruxton Park. The cabins are now part of the "rusted weather-beaten ruins" that remain. Although the power plant continues to operate, there is no longer a caretaker that lives in Ruxton Park. There are sometimes caretakers who oversee the reservoir who may stay in the house in Ruxton Park. It can be accessed via a hike or a  automobile trip over rough back roads.

Notes

References

External links

Manitou Springs, Colorado
Parks in El Paso County, Colorado
Former populated places in El Paso County, Colorado
Ghost towns in Colorado